Gazetted officer may refer to:

 Gazetted Officer (India)
 Gazetted Officer (Kenya)
 Gazetted officer (Sri Lanka)
 Order of Precedence in Nepal which has replaced the older gazette system
 A officer in the armed forces whose commission has been published in a government gazette